Johann Veldener (born in Würzburg, died in Leuven between 1486 and 1496), also known as Jan Veldener or Johan Veldenaer; was an early printer in Flanders. He worked as a punchcutter and printer in Cologne, together with William Caxton, who may have financed his first books. They both left for Flanders in 1472. Evidence indicates that Veldener assisted Caxton in setting up his printing office in Bruges and helped printing his first work there, the 1472-1473 Recuyell of the Historyes of Troye by Raoul Lefèvre. Afterwards, Veldener went to Leuven and set up his printing company there, becoming the second printer in Leuven after John of Westphalia, and the third or fourth in the Netherlands. He entered the Leuven University on 30 July 1473 in the faculty of Medicine.

He left Leuven in 1477, after the death of Charles the Bold caused unrest in the city, and went to Utrecht. When that city also became troubled, he left for Culemborg, and finally returned to Leuven in 1484.

Veldener was also known for creating typefaces, both for his own work and for others, and Caxton is believed to have taken one of Veldener's typefaces with him to England and used it among others on his first edition of the Canterbury Tales. It is probable that he later bought a number of other typefaces from Veldener as well.

While in Utrecht, Veldener also supposedly wrote a Chronyck van Hollandt, Zeelandt, ende Westvrieslandt (a Chronicle of Holland, Sealand, and Western Friesland), which was reprinted in 1650 in Utrecht. Other works attributed to him are the Cronijcken van Enghelant (a chronicle of the English kings until 1460), Cronijcken van Utrecht (a history of the Bishopric of Utrecht), Cronijcken van Gelre, Cronijcken van Cleve and the Cronijcken van Brabant. Currently it is believed that these works were anonymous and printed by him, and that the later attributions to him as writer are erroneous.

Works printed by Veldener

In Cologne (1471-1472)
Walter Burley, De vita philosophorum
Pope Pius II, De duobus amantibus
Gesta Romanorum
Flores Sancti Augustini
Bartholomeus Anglicus, De proprietatibus rerum

In Leuven (1473-1477)

1473
Giovanni Boccaccio, Genealogia deorum

1474
Jacobus de Theramo, Consolatio peccatorum From the Rare Book and Special Collections Division at the Library of Congress
Pietro de' Crescenzi, Liber ruralium commodorum

1475
Angelus de Gambiglionibus de Aretio, also known as Angeli Aretini or Angelo Gambiglioni, Lectura super institutionibus
Werner Rolevinck, Fasciculus temporum (the second illustrated book to be printed in the Low Countries)
Lucan, Pharsalia
Laurentius Valla, Elegantiae linguae latinae

1476
An almanach, considered to be the oldest known printed almanach in the Netherlands 
Carolus Maneken,  (first impression of this book)
Pope Pius II,  and

1477
Cicero, 
Raimundus Peraudi, 
Thomas Aquinas,

In Utrecht (1478-1481)

1478

1479
Pope Gregory I, Homiliae super Evangeliis / Omelie in duutschen

1480
Werner Rolevinck, reedited with some additional chronicles (attributed sometimes to Veldener); this is the first translation of this book (first published in Latin in 1474, Latin version printed by Veldener in 1475)
Jacobus de Voragine, 
Lucas de Tollentis,

In Culemborg (1483-1484)

1483
Spieghel der menschlicker behoudenisse
Boec van den Houte
Spinroc

1484
Kruidboeck in Dietsche (possibly printed in Leuven)

In Leuven again (1484-1487?)
Alphabetum divini amoris (two editions)
Vocabularius (in French and Dutch and Latin)

1484
Pope Innocent VIII, Regulae cancellariae apostolicae, Lectae 23 Sept. 1484
Michael Scotus, Liber physiognomiae
Franciscus de Zabarellis, Repetitio super capitulo Perpendimus de sententia excommunicationis

1485
Herbarius in Latino (reprinted with illustrations in 1486)

1486
Matheolus Perusinus, De memoria augenda
Paulus de Middelburgo, Prognosticon (in Dutch)
Cornelius Roelans de Mechlinia, Opusculum aegritudinum puerorum

1487
Valuacie van den gelde

Notes

Further reading
Biography from the 1895 Allgemeine Deutsche Biographie

Year of birth missing
Year of death missing
Printers of incunabula
German printers
German typographers and type designers